The Electric Ride E-Bird is a German electric ultralight trike developed and produced by Electric Ride of Baierbrunn. The aircraft is supplied complete and ready-to-fly.

Design and development
The E-Bird is an electric-powered development of the Aeros ANT. It was designed to comply with the Fédération Aéronautique Internationale microlight category, German 120 kg class and the US FAR 103 Ultralight Vehicles rules.

The aircraft design features a cable-braced hang glider-style high-wing, weight-shift controls, a single-seat open cockpit without a cockpit fairing, tricycle landing gear and a single electric motor in pusher configuration.

The aircraft is made from bolted-together aluminum tubing, with its double surface "topless" Aeros Combat wing covered in Dacron sailcloth. Its  span wing uses an "A" frame weight-shift control bar. The maximum sound in flight is under 47 dB.

Like the ANT it is based upon the E-Bird van be folded up and transported and carried in an automobile trunk.

Specifications (E-Bird)

References

External links

E-Bird
2010s German sport aircraft
2010s German ultralight aircraft
Single-engined pusher aircraft
Ultralight trikes
Electric aircraft